The Stamps-Baxter Music Company was an influential publishing company in the shape note Southern gospel music field. The company issued several paperback publications each year with cheap binding and printed on cheap paper. Thus, the older books are now in delicate condition. These songbooks were used in church singing events, called "conventions," as well as at other church events, although they did not take the place of regular hymnals.  Among the country music and bluegrass "standards" that were first published by Stamps-Baxter are "Rank Strangers to Me", "Just a Little Talk with Jesus", "Precious Memories", "Farther Along", "If We Never Meet Again", "Victory in Jesus", and "I Won't Have to Cross Jordan Alone".

Stamps and Baxter operated a music school which was the primary source of the thousands of gospel songs they published.  Another major part of the corporation was its sponsorship of gospel quartets who sang the company's music in churches throughout the southern United States. At the end of World War II they were sponsoring 35 such quartets. The company also had a quartet who sang on radio station KRLD in Dallas, beginning in 1936. This station would boost its transmitting power at midnight, so that it could be heard across the nation. An additional part of the Stamps-Baxter music empire was a magazine, Gospel Music News. Each part of the corporation supported every other part, giving strength to the entire organization.

History 
Virgil Oliver Stamps founded the company in 1924 and J. R. Baxter Jr. joined him to form the Stamps-Baxter Music Company, which was based in Dallas, Texas, with offices in Chattanooga, Tennessee and Pangburn, Arkansas.  Stamps got his start working for the James D. Vaughan Publishing Company from which he got many of his business ideas.

In 1945, Frank Stamps, younger brother of V. O. Stamps, left the organization to form the rival Stamps Quartet Music Company. At the same time a number of quartets left Stamps-Baxter resulting in the end of the company’s quartet sponsorship coinciding with the end of the war.  Frank’s defection did not hurt the Stamps-Baxter company in the long run, although it did lead to some confusion among the public.  The Stamps-Baxter School of Music declined after World War II, but its successor continues to this day as an annual two-week singing school under the leadership of Ben Speer.

Stamps died in 1940, leaving the company to J. R. Baxter. After Baxter died in 1960, his widow, Clarice Howard "Ma" Baxter, ran the company until her death in 1972.  In 1974, the company was sold to Zondervan, which became part of the Benson Company in 1986, and is now part of Capitol Christian Music Group.

Songbooks
The "convention" song books typically included 140 songs.  The first song would be on the inside front cover, numbered 00 with the first song inside the book being numbered 1-A, and the rest of the songs were numbered 1 through 138. Each book included four or five older public domain songs such as John Newton's "Amazing Grace", Mackay's "Revive Us Again", Stennett’s "I Am Bound for the Promised Land", and Smith’s "America". In addition, one or two songs from earlier Stamps-Baxter publications might be included. The other 134 songs would consist of new material that had never been published before. The authors and composers of these songs were paid as much as $7.00 for each song, which would be the only monetary compensation that they would get.

Copyrights 
The Stamps-Baxter company was careful to renew its copyrights under United States copyright law. The collections, not the individual songs, were copyrighted, so that anyone looking up records for the songs must know in which collection it was first published.  Under current U. S. copyright law, works published between 1922 and 1963 will not enter public domain until 95 years after their initial year of copyright if the copyright was renewed.  Thus, a Stamps-Baxter song last copyrighted in 1929 will enter public domain in 2024.

There is also a claim to copyright on these songs. On October 16, 1998, three corporations, Brentwood-Benson Music Publishing, Inc., Stamps-Baxter Music, and Bridge Building Music, Inc., filed for copyright on "Glory Special" & 19,618 other titles. This large collection includes all of the Stamps-Baxter convention songs. Brentwood-Benson Music Publishing, Inc now owns Stamps-Baxter Music and Bridge Building Music. Therefore, the copyright is maintained by Brentwood-Benson Music Publishing, Inc.

Titles

See also
Marion W. Easterling

References

Further reading
 Fresne, Jeannette. "History of the Stamps Baxter Singing Schools and Normal School of Music." Journal of Historical Research in Music Education, vol. 30, no. 1, 2008, pp. 21–38. JSTOR, www.jstor.org/stable/40215347.

External links 
Stamps-Baxter publications
 Blog by a student of the Stamps-Baxter school
 Torreyson Library, University of Central Arkansas
  Luther Presley Collection, University of Central Arkansas

Music publishing companies of the United States
Publishing companies established in 1924
Shape note
Southern gospel
Defunct music companies